Pius Bazighe (born 15 March 1972) is a retired male javelin thrower from Nigeria, who represented his native country at the 1996 Summer Olympics in Atlanta, Georgia. He set his personal best (81.08 metres) on 16 June 1999 at a meet in Athens, Greece, breaking the Nigerian national record.

International competitions

External links

sports-reference

1972 births
Living people
Nigerian javelin throwers
Male javelin throwers
Nigerian male athletes
Olympic athletes of Nigeria
Athletes (track and field) at the 1996 Summer Olympics
World Athletics Championships athletes for Nigeria
African Games gold medalists for Nigeria
African Games medalists in athletics (track and field)
African Games silver medalists for Nigeria
Athletes (track and field) at the 1991 All-Africa Games
Athletes (track and field) at the 1995 All-Africa Games